Michael Rodgers (born April 24, 1985) is an American professional track and field sprinter who specializes in the 100 m and the 60 m. He won the gold medal in the 100m relay in Doha 2019. He is also the Pan-Am Games Champion.

Career
Rodgers attended Berkeley High School in St. Louis, Missouri where he ran varsity track and played varsity basketball for the Bulldogs. Later attended Lindenwood University and Oklahoma Baptist University where he was a 10-time NAIA national champion from 2005 to 2007. Rodgers still holds the NAIA Indoor 60m record with a 6.65.

In 60 meters, he became the 2008 US Indoor Champion and went on to finish fourth at the 2008 World Indoor Championships.  In the 100 meters he finished sixth at the 2008 World Athletics Final.

The start of the 2009 outdoor season saw Rodgers improve his 100 and 200 meter personal bests: at the Grande Prêmio Brasil Caixa meet in May he recorded times of 10.01 and 20.24 seconds respectively. He further improved his 100 m best in June at the Prefontaine Classic, breaking the 10-second barrier for the first time with a world-leading performance of 9.94 seconds.

Rodgers qualified for his first World Championships in Athletics with a win at the 2009 US Championships in June. Of his first outdoor national victory he said: "This is my year. I came here with a lot of confidence. I think I can medal in Berlin if I work hard and stay humble." He reached the semi-finals at the 2009 World Championships, finishing fifth and just missing out on a place in the 100 m final. He closed the season with a fourth-place finish at the 2009 IAAF World Athletics Final.

The following year he turned to the 60 m at the 2010 IAAF World Indoor Championships and took the silver medal behind Dwain Chambers with a run of 6.53 seconds – his first medal on the global stage.

He improved up to running 9.85 at the Prefontaine classic 2011.

On July 19, 2011 he tested positive for a banned stimulant at a meeting in Italy. Rodgers claimed innocence, but accepted a provisional ban making him ineligible to participate at the World Championships in Daegu that year. He and his agent, Tony Campbell, initially claimed that Rodgers accidentally ingested the stimulant in an energy drink containing the stimulant at a club in Italy. He later accepted that he had taken a supplement called "Jack3d" which contained the stimulant methylhexanamine, a substance commonly found in nutritional supplements and energy drinks. In March 2012 he accepted a 9-month ban starting from the day his urine sample was taken, making him still eligible to participate at the USA Olympic Trials in Eugene that year.

Statistics
Information from World Athletics profile.

Personal bests

International championship results

Circuit wins
Outdoor
Diamond League 
Zürich Weltklasse: 2010 (4×100 m relay)
Monaco Herculis: 2012 (4×100 m relay), 2013 (4×100 m relay), 2015 (4×100 m relay)
Lausanne Athletissima: 2013 (100 m)
Paris Meeting Areva: 2014 (100 m)
Other World Tour / World Challenge meets
Stockholm DN-galan: 2008 (4×100 m relay)
Belém Grande Prêmio Brasil Caixa de Atletismo: 2009 (100 m & 200 m), 2010 (100 m)
New York Reebok Grand Prix: 2009 (100 m)
Eugene Prefontaine Classic: 2009 (100 m)
Zhukovsky Znamensky Memorial: 2010 (100 m)
Tokyo Seiko Golden Grand Prix: 2013 (100 m)
Zagreb Hanžeković Memorial: 2013 (100 m), 2018 (100 m, 2019 (100 m)
Madrid Meeting de Atletismo: 2015 (100 m)
Nanjing World Challenge: 2019 (100 m)
Turku Paavo Nurmi Games: 2019 (100 m)

Indoor
World Indoor Tour (60 m)
Overall winner: 2016
Karlsruhe Indoor Meeting: 2016
Boston New Balance Indoor Grand Prix: 2016
Madrid Indoor Meeting: 2018, 2019

National championship results

Seasonal bests

Notes

References

External links

Mike Rodgers profile at Team USA
Mike Rodgers profile at USATF

1985 births
Living people
African-American male track and field athletes
American male sprinters
American sportspeople in doping cases
Athletes (track and field) at the 2016 Summer Olympics
Athletes (track and field) at the 2019 Pan American Games
College men's track and field athletes in the United States
Doping cases in athletics
Olympic track and field athletes of the United States
Pan American Games bronze medalists for the United States
Pan American Games track and field athletes for the United States
Pan American Games gold medalists for the United States
Pan American Games medalists in athletics (track and field)
Track and field athletes from St. Louis
World Athletics Championships winners
World Athletics Championships athletes for the United States
World Athletics Championships medalists
World Athletics Indoor Championships medalists
USA Indoor Track and Field Championships winners
USA Outdoor Track and Field Championships winners
IAAF Continental Cup winners
Pan American Games gold medalists in athletics (track and field)
Medalists at the 2019 Pan American Games
21st-century African-American sportspeople
20th-century African-American people